Aegaeae or Aigaiai may refer to:
 Aigai (Aeolis), a town ancient of ancient Aeolis, now in Turkey
 Aegae (Cilicia), a town ancient of ancient Cilicia, now in Turkey
 Aegiae, a town of ancient Laconia, Greece